The deputy prime minister of Nepal is the deputy head of government of Nepal. The deputy prime minister is second in seniority in the Council of Ministers of Nepal. The deputy prime minister is the senior-most member of cabinet after prime minister in the Government of Nepal. The deputy prime minister presides and chairs the cabinet in the absence of prime minister.

Constitutional provisions

Remuneration 
The remuneration of Deputy Prime Minister of Nepal as per Section 78 of 2015 Constitution of Nepal shall be as provided for by Federal Act. Until such an Act is formulated, it shall be as determined by the Government of Nepal.

Oath of office 
The Deputy Prime Minister shall take the oath of office and secrecy before the President as per Section 80 of 2015 Constitution of Nepal.

List of deputy prime ministers of Nepal

The following individuals have been officially appointed as deputy prime minister of Nepal since the country was declared a republic in 2008:

References

Politics of Nepal